Dismorphia is a genus of butterflies in the subfamily Dismorphiinae.

List of species
 Dismorphia altis Fassl, 1910
 Dismorphia amphione (Cramer, 1779)
 Dismorphia arcadia (C. Felder & R. Felder, 1862)
 Dismorphia astyocha Hübner, [1831]
 Dismorphia boliviana Forster, 1955
 Dismorphia crisia (Drury, 1782)
 Dismorphia cubana (Herrich-Schäffer, 1862)
 Dismorphia eunoe (Doubleday, 1844)
 Dismorphia hyposticta (C. Felder & R. Felder, 1861)
 Dismorphia laja (Cramer, 1779)
 Dismorphia lelex (Hewitson, 1869)
 Dismorphia lewyi (Lucas, 1852)
 Dismorphia lua (Hewitson, 1869)
 Dismorphia lycosura (Hewitson, [1860])
 Dismorphia lygdamis (Hewitson, 1869)
 Dismorphia lysis (Hewitson, 1869)
 Dismorphia medora (Doubleday, 1844)
 Dismorphia medorilla (Hewitson, 1877)
 Dismorphia melia (Godart, [1824])
 Dismorphia mirandola (Hewitson, 1878)
 Dismorphia niepelti Weymer, 1909
 Dismorphia pseudolewyi Forster, 1955
 Dismorphia spio (Godart, 1819)
 Dismorphia teresa (Hewitson, 1869)
 Dismorphia thermesia (Godart, 1819)
 Dismorphia thermesina (Hopffer, 1874)
 Dismorphia theucharila (Doubleday, 1848)
 Dismorphia zaela (Hewitson, [1858])
 Dismorphia zathoe (Hewitson, [1858])

References

External links

 
images representing Dismorphia at Consortium for the Barcode of Life

Dismorphiinae
Pieridae of South America
Pieridae genera
Taxa named by Jacob Hübner